Lesley Faye Collier  (born 13 March 1947) is an English ballerina and teacher of dance. In 1972 she became a principal dancer of the Royal Ballet. In 1995 she left the company and began to teach at the Royal Ballet School. She is a rèpetiteur at the Royal Ballet.

Early life
Born at Orpington in Kent to Roy Collier and Mavis (née Head), Collier began dancing at the age of two and won a scholarship to attend the Royal Ballet School. In 1965 she completed her years at the school and for her graduation performance danced the leading role in Frederick Ashton's The Two Pigeons.

Dancing career
Upon leaving the Royal Ballet School in 1965, Collier joined the Royal Ballet. In 1968 she was given her first solo roles. She went on to perform in all of the important classical ballets, and in 1972 became a principal dancer.<ref>Robin May, The World of Ballet (1989), p. 38: "Lesley Collier is British and was born in 1947. A pupil of the Royal Academy of Dancing and of the Royal Ballet School, she joined the company in 1965 and became a principal in 1972."</ref>

On 13 November 1978 Collier danced with Wayne Sleep in a Royal Variety Performance at the London Palladium.

In 1981 The Ballet Goer's Guide called her "a dancer of sparkling technique and speed".

During her dance career Collier played leading roles in the ballets Giselle, La fille mal gardée, Anastasia, Romeo and Juliet, Mayerling and Cinderella. She also played the lead in Tchaikovsky's The Sleeping Beauty, The Nutcracker and Swan Lake.

Subsequent career
After retiring in 1995 she joined the teaching staff of the Royal Ballet School.
Family
In 1977 in Westminster, Collier married Nicholas Dromgoole, once headmaster of Pierepont House School, and latterly ballet correspondent of The Times.

On DVDGreat Pas de Deux (NVC Arts/Warner Music Group, 1997): dancing The Nutcracker'' with Anthony Dowell

References

External links
Lesley Collier at the Ballerina Gallery

1947 births
English ballerinas
Ballet teachers
Commanders of the Order of the British Empire
Principal dancers of The Royal Ballet
People educated at the Royal Ballet School
People from Orpington
Living people